James Edward Church, Jr. (February 15, 1869 – August 5, 1959) is best known for having developed the Mount Rose snow sampler (1906), the first instrument for measuring snow water content. It is still in use today. He was also active in promoting the then nascent sciences of snow hydrology and water supply forecasting.

Dr. Church, who received his Ph.D. from the University of Munich, was born in Holly, Michigan on February 15, 1869. He taught Latin, German and fine arts at the University of Nevada, Reno from 1892 to 1939 and was the first person of European descent to ascend Mount Rose (1896). Dr. Church died in Reno, Nevada, on August 5, 1959. The Church Fine Arts Complex on the University of Nevada, Reno campus—which opened in 1962, 3 years after his death—is named after him.

Footnotes

External links 
A Guide to the Papers of James Edward Church NC96, Special Collections, University Libraries, University of Nevada, Reno. (includes a biography of Church and a biography his wife, Florence).
 A Guide to the Papers of James Edward Church AC 0248, University Archive, University Libraries, University of Nevada, Reno. 
 The history of Church: how NRCS’ snow survey program got started , Natural Resources Conservation Service Vermont.

1869 births
1959 deaths
People from Holly, Michigan
University of Nevada, Reno faculty